Juan Carlos Ramos Vaquero (born 17 July 1962), known by his stage name Ivan, is a Spanish singer. He was discovered by CBS producer Oscar Gómez, and recorded a self-titled album, Iván. His first single was "Sin amor"  ("Without Love") from 1979. In the 1980s, he sold over 5 million albums. He recorded a number of songs with José Luis Perales. He had hit songs in Mexico, Colombia, Ecuador and Chile before his career was interrupted by his compulsory military service. He released the album Fotonovela in 2012, which included a remake of his song of the same name.

Sources differ on his birth date with some identifying 1959 and others 1962. His daughter is Nathalia Ramos who is an actress in Hollywood films.

Discography

Albums 

 Sin Amor (1979)
 A Solas (1980)
 Tiempo de Ivan (1982)
 Baila (1985)
 Hey! Mademoiselle! (1986)
 Mas Dificil (1988)
 Vuelta a Casa (1992)
 Fotonovela (2000, compilation)
 Sus Cuatro Primeros Discos en CBS (1979-1986) (2004, compilation)
 Grandes Exitos (2004, compilation)

Singles

References

1962 births
Spanish pop singers
Spanish Italo disco musicians
Living people